UPW may refer to:

Union of Post Office Workers, the former name of the Union of Communication Workers, in the United Kingdom.
Ultimate Pro Wrestling, a defunct professional wrestling promotion.
Ultrapure Water, a type of water used during semiconductor manufacturing or chem./physics experiencies.
United Public Workers (later United Public Workers of America)
UPW, the National Rail station code for Upwey railway station, Dorset, England